Stray Bullet is the name of two 1998 American-Irish action films for Concorde Anois.

Stray Bullet

Cast
Robert Carradine
Fred Dryer

Stray Bullet II

The film did well enough for a sequel, Stray Bullet II.

This was also known as Dangerous Curves.

Cast
Robert Carradine
David Carradine
Maxine Bahn

References

External links
Stray Bullet at TCMDB
Stray Bullet at IMDb
Stray Bullet II aka Dangerous Curves at IMDb
Stray Bullet II at BFI
Dangerous Curves at TCMDB
Dangerous Curves at Letterbox DVD

1998 films
Irish action films
1990s English-language films
Films directed by Rob Spera